Chryseobacterium haifense  is a psychrotolerant bacteria from the genus of Chryseobacterium which has been isolated from raw milk in Israel.

References

Further reading

External links
Type strain of Chryseobacterium haifense at BacDive -  the Bacterial Diversity Metadatabase

haifense
Bacteria described in 2007
Psychrophiles